City Hall is a 1996 American suspense drama film directed by Harold Becker and starring Al Pacino, John Cusack, Bridget Fonda and Danny Aiello. The film was Becker's second collaboration with Pacino, having directed him in Sea of Love (1989).

Plot summary
In New York City, Detective Eddie Santos and mob figure Tino Zapatti kill each other in a shootout; a stray bullet also kills a child passing by. In the wake of the tragedy, questions are raised as to why Judge Walter Stern, an old friend of the ambitious Mayor John Pappas, had previously set the criminal responsible free on probation. Pappas' loyal deputy mayor, Kevin Calhoun, decides to dig for answers. Meanwhile, police union lawyer Marybeth Cogan uncovers a conspiracy to smear Santos.

Calhoun's investigation leads to Frank Anselmo, a Brooklyn politician who has connections to Tino's uncle, crime boss Paul Zapatti. Anselmo plants money at Zapatti's behest to frame Santos. Calhoun and Cogan continue to seek the truth from a number of sources, including Santos's partner and another Zapatti relative. After the murder of probation officer Larry Schwartz, they ultimately conclude that Judge Stern had to be on the take. Pappas agrees that Stern must resign.

The scandal snowballs to the point where Zapatti instructs Anselmo to commit suicide rather than become an informer or go to jail. To protect his family, Anselmo shoots himself. Calhoun uncovers evidence that Pappas put Stern together with Anselmo to receive a bribe and leave the young Zapatti on the street. Shocked and disheartened by the revelation, Calhoun talks to Pappas and tells him there is only one choice—to quit as mayor and leave politics for good. Even though Pappas initially wants to fight the nearing scandal, he has great respect for Calhoun's integrity and acquiesces to his request. Pappas and Calhoun share an emotional goodbye, and Pappas retires from politics.

Some time later Calhoun runs for city councilor and loses the election, remaining steadfast on trying to make a place for himself in politics and also make the city a better place in which to live.

Cast
 Al Pacino as Mayor John Pappas
 John Cusack as Kevin Calhoun
 Danny Aiello as Frank Anselmo
 Murphy Guyer as Captain Florian
 John Finn as Commissioner Coonan
 Bridget Fonda as Marybeth Cogan
 Anthony Franciosa as Paul Zapatti
 Martin Landau as Judge Walter Stern
 David Paymer as Abe Goodman
 Richard Schiff as Larry Schwartz
 Harry Bugin as Morty the Waiter
 Lauren Vélez as Elaine Santos

Fritz Hollings, the then-current U.S. Senator from South Carolina, plays Senator Marquand, whom Pappas and Calhoun lobby in order to land the Democratic National convention.

Former New York City mayor and presiding judge of The People's Court Ed Koch also has a brief cameo in a political commentary segment of a TV news broadcast.

Production
In January 1994, it was announced Harold Becker had made a deal with Paramount Pictures to direct City Hall, a drama in the vein of Network written by Bo Goldman. The following month, it was announced Castle Rock Entertainment had picked up City Hall after Paramount let their option lapse.

Tom Cruise at one point was in preliminary negotiations to star in the film, but negotiations quickly fell apart.

Reception

Critical response 
On Rotten Tomatoes the film holds an approval rating of 56% based on 25 reviews, with an average rating of 6/10. The website's critics consensus reads: "City Hall explores political corruption with commendable intelligence, but this web of scandal struggles to coalesce into satisfying drama." Audiences polled by CinemaScore gave the film an average grade of "B−" on an A+ to F scale.

Roger Ebert gave the film two-and-a-half out of four stars and wrote, "Many of the parts of City Hall are so good that the whole should add up to more, but it doesn't."

Box office
The film was released on February 16, 1996 in 1,815 theatres. It debuted at number 4 at the United States box office, grossing $8 million. For its second weekend, it landed at number 6, grossing $13.8 million. The film grossed $20.3 million in the U.S. and Canada and $13.1 million internationally for a worldwide total of $33.4 million.

References

External links
 
 
 
 
 

1996 films
1996 drama films
American political drama films
Films set in New York City
Films shot in New York City
Films shot in New Jersey
Castle Rock Entertainment films
Columbia Pictures films
Films directed by Harold Becker
Films scored by Jerry Goldsmith
Films with screenplays by Paul Schrader
Films with screenplays by Bo Goldman
1990s English-language films
1990s American films